The No Commercial Airport at Whenuapai Airbase Party was a local political party in New Zealand which opposed the transformation of Auckland's Whenuapai airbase into a commercial airport.

The party was inspired by the success of the Whenuapai Airbase Action Group (Waag) in turning the fate of the airbase into a political issue during the 2007 local body elections.

The party applied to register a logo with the Electoral Commission on 21 April 2008.  The party however failed to apply for formal registration so was limited to its sole candidate at the 2008 election.

It ran a single electorate candidate in 2008 and received 238 electorate votes.  It did not run in the 2011 election.

In the local body elections of October 2007, the pro-airport North Shore City mayor was defeated by an anti-airport mayoral candidate with indications that the airport issue was the most important of factors considered by voters. Subsequently, North Shore City Council reversed support for a Whenuapai International Airport while the Waitakere City Council remained in favour. In 2010, all councils were amalgamated into the new Auckland Council and therefore support for a commercial airport was dropped.

References

Political parties established in 2008
No Commercial Airport at Whenuapai Airbase
Single-issue political parties
Aviation in New Zealand
Single-issue political parties in New Zealand